The 2020 World Athletics Continental Tour is an annual series of elite track and field athletic competitions, recognised by World Athletics (formerly known as the IAAF). The Tour forms the second tier of international one-day meetings after the Diamond League except in the 200m, 3000m steeplechase, discus, hammer and triple jump, where it forms the top-tier, these events having been removed from the Diamond League from 2020. 2020 was the series' inaugural season.

2020 schedule

The Continental Tour will be divided into three levels – Gold, Silver and Bronze – whose status will be determined by the quality of competition and prize money on offer.

Continental Tour gold level schedule

Continental Tour silver level schedule

Continental Tour bronze level schedule

Events cancelled

Continental Tour gold level schedule

Continental Tour silver level schedule

Continental Tour bronze level schedule

References

External links

2020
World Athletics Continental Tour